Pir Hayati-ye Olya (also Romanized as Pīr Ḩayātī-ye ‘Olyā; also known as Kahfri, Kofrī, and Pīr Hayātī-ye Bālā) is a village in Mahidasht Rural District, Mahidasht District, Kermanshah County, Kermanshah Province, Iran. At the 2006 census, its population was 91, in 20 families.

References 

Populated places in Kermanshah County